Welham Green railway station serves the village of Welham Green in Hertfordshire, England.  It is  measured from King's Cross on the East Coast Main Line.

Welham Green is just south of the scene of the Hatfield rail crash in 2000 and was initially identified in BBC broadcasts as the location of the accident.

History

Welham Green station was opened on 29 September 1986 on the site of the former Marshmoor Sidings. It has two platforms and was opened by British Rail.

The station was built with funding from Welwyn District Council, Hertfordshire County Council, Hatfield Parish Council and British Rail.

The booking office at Welham Green was equipped with APTIS in December 1986, making it one of the first stations with the ticketing system which was eventually found across the UK at all staffed British Rail stations by the end of the 1980s.

Facilities

A booking office, open during the morning rush hour, is located on the northbound platform and is reached, from the west, through the station car park. A self-service 'Shere' ticket machine was installed in Autumn 2008 on the road overbridge, at the entrance to the northbound platform.

There are shelters on both platforms, and a small amount of seating near them.

Services
Moorgate trains formerly ran only on weekdays up until 10 pm (running to Kings Cross outside of these times), but now run there at all times (including weekends) since the December 2015 timetable change. Night and weekend trains run every 30 minutes. There are three trains per hour to Welwyn Garden City, reduced to two trains per hour in the late evenings and at weekends.

Ticket Office Opening Times & Station Staffing Hours

Below are the current opening and staffing times for Welham Green, .

Route

References

External links

Railway stations in Hertfordshire
DfT Category E stations
Railway stations opened by British Rail
Railway stations in Great Britain opened in 1986
Railway stations served by Govia Thameslink Railway